"Grace, Too" is a song by Canadian rock band The Tragically Hip. It was released in September 1994 as the lead single from their fourth studio album, Day for Night. The song peaked at number 11 on the RPM Canadian Singles chart.

Live performances
In 1995, The Tragically Hip performed the song on Saturday Night Live. The band also opened their Woodstock 1999 performance with this song.

During live performances, Gord Downie frequently replaced the opening line, "He said I'm fabulously rich" with "He said I'm Tragically Hip", often to applause from the crowd.

Covers
In 2011, the song was covered by Selina Martin for the first Have Not Been the Same charity compilation.

Singer-songwriter Justin Rutledge covered the song for his 2014 album Daredevil, an album consisting entirely of Tragically Hip covers.

Following Downie's death in October 2017, country singer Dallas Smith performed the song during his concert at Kingston's K-Rock Centre on October 19.

On October 11, 2018, six days before the one-year anniversary of Downie's death, Johnny Fay and Rob Baker joined Choir! Choir! Choir! at Yonge-Dundas Square for a live performance of the song.

The song was covered by Twin Flames on their 2020 album Omen.

Charts

Weekly charts

Year-end charts

References

External links

1994 singles
The Tragically Hip songs
1994 songs
MCA Records singles